John Twomey may refer to:

 John Twomey (athlete) (born 1923), American athlete
 John Twomey (musician) (born c. 1940), American manualist
 John Twomey (hurler) (born 1962), Irish hurler
 John Twomey (sailor) (born 1955), Irish athlete and sailor
 John Twomey (trade unionist) (born 1866), Welsh trade union leader